is a Japanese freestyle skier, specializing in ski cross.

Fukushima competed at the 2010 Winter Olympics for Japan. She placed 21st in the qualifying round in ski cross, to advance to the knockout stages. She finish third in her first round heat, failing to advance.

As of April 2013, her best finish at the World Championships is 6th, in 2005.

Fukushima made her World Cup debut in January 2004. As of April 2013, she has one World Cup podium finish, a third place coming at Flaine in 2007–08. Her best World Cup overall finish in ski cross is 5th, in 2007–08.

World Cup Podiums

References

1979 births
Living people
Olympic freestyle skiers of Japan
Freestyle skiers at the 2010 Winter Olympics
People from Nagano Prefecture
Japanese female freestyle skiers
Asian Games medalists in alpine skiing
Alpine skiers at the 2003 Asian Winter Games
Asian Games bronze medalists for Japan
Medalists at the 2003 Asian Winter Games
21st-century Japanese women